Xiao Mingjie (born 14 January 1997) is a Chinese footballer currently playing as a defender for Hubei WHSU Zaiming.

Club career
Xiao Mingjie was promoted to the senior team of Shanghai SIPG within the 2019 Chinese Super League season and would make his debut in league game on 30 March 2019 against Hebei China Fortune F.C. in a 2-1 victory where he came on as a substitute for Fu Huan.

Career statistics

References

External links

1997 births
Living people
Chinese footballers
Association football defenders
Chinese Super League players
Shanghai Port F.C. players